Emily Wurramara is an Indigenous Australian singer and songwriter.

In 2018, Wurramara was nominated for Best Blues and Roots Album at the ARIA Awards.

Early life

She grew up in Brisbane.

Music

Wurramara writes and sings in both English and Anindilyakwa.

In 2016, she released her debut EP, Black Smoke, which earned her a Queensland Music Award. She followed it up with an album named Milyakburra in 2018 and toured nationally with Alice Skye.

In November 2022, she collaborated with other First Nations artists Emma Donovan, DOBBY, Drmngnow, and Optamus to create a song in memory of Cassius Turvey, a Noongar-Yamatji boy who had died at the age of 15 the result of an assault by a random attacker when walking home from school in Perth, Western Australia. The song, titled "Forever 15", was played at Turvey's funeral on 18 November 2022 funeral and released three days later on 21 November 2022.

Personal life
On 2 May 2019, a fire at her home in Brisbane destroyed most of her belongings.

Discography

Albums

Extended plays

Singles

Non-single album appearances

Awards and nominations

AIR Awards
The Australian Independent Record Awards (commonly known informally as AIR Awards) is an annual awards night to recognise, promote and celebrate the success of Australia's Independent Music sector.

|-
| rowspan="2" | AIR Awards of 2019
| Emily Wurramara
| Breakthrough Independent Artist
| 
|-
| Milyakburra
| Best Independent Blues and Roots Album
| 
|-

ARIA Music Awards
The ARIA Music Awards is an annual awards ceremony that recognises excellence, innovation, and achievement across all genres of Australian music.

|-
| 2018
| Milyakburra
| Best Blues & Roots Album
| 
|-

Environmental Music Prize
The Environmental Music Prize is a quest to find a theme song to inspire action on climate and conservation. It commenced in 2022.

! 
|-
| 2022
| "When a Tree Falls" (The Boy of Many Colors featuring Emily Wurramara)
| Environmental Music Prize
| 
| 
|-

National Indigenous Music Awards
The National Indigenous Music Awards (NIMA) is an annual award ceremony and recognises excellence, dedication, innovation and outstanding contribution to the Northern Territory music industry.

|-
| rowspan="2"| 2017
| "Herself"
|  New Talent of the Year
| 
|-
| "Hey Love"
|  Song of the Year
| 
|-
| rowspan="2"| 2018
| "Herself"
|  New Talent of the Year
| 
|-
| Milyakburra
|  Album of the Year
| 
|-
| 2020
| "Herself"
|  Artist of the Year
| 
|-

Queensland Music Awards
The Queensland Music Awards (previously known as Q Song Awards) are annual awards celebrating Queensland, Australia's brightest emerging artists and established legends. They commenced in 2006.
 
|-
| 2017
| "Ngayuwa Nalyelyingminama (I Love You)"
| Indigenous Song of the Year
| 
|-
| 2018
| "Ngayuwa Nalyelyingminama (I Love You)"
| Indigenous Song of the Year
| 
|-
|rowspan="2"|2019
| "Lady Blue"
| Indigenous Song of the Year
| 
|-
| "Tap Sticks"
| Blues and Roots Song of the Year
| 
|-

References

Indigenous Australian musicians
Living people
Year of birth missing (living people)
Australian women singer-songwriters
Musicians from the Northern Territory